"Free" is a song recorded by American country music group Zac Brown Band for their 2008 album The Foundation. On April 12, 2010, it was released as the fifth and final single from the album. It debuted on the Billboard Hot Country Songs charts at number 54 for the week of May 1, 2010.  The song was nominated for the Best Country Performance by a Duo or Group with Vocal and the Best Country Song at the 53rd Annual Grammy Awards.

Music video
A live performance music video was released to CMT in May 2010. The performance was taken from the band's Pass The Jar DVD, and features a guest appearance by Joey + Rory. A video for the studio version was released on May 28, 2010. Both videos were directed by Darren Doane.  An alternate music video was released as a tribute to the United States military fighting in the Middle East.  The video contains video of Zac Brown Band visiting troops on their USO tour, socializing with the troops, and performing a concert for the troops.  The song itself is heard as a soundtrack to the video.  The concert in the video, given by Zac Brown Band, is never heard, just depicted.

Inspiration for the song
Zac and his band decided to climb Mount Warning during a trip to Byron Bay in the Australian state of New South Wales in 2006. Mt Warning stands 3,793 ft above sea level and is the first place that the sun touches in the morning as it rises over the Australian Mainland. As Zac sat there in the beautiful peace and quiet, he and his band were the only people on earth to be there at that point experiencing this magnificent display of nature and it is then that they wrote this song.

Critical reception
Kyle Ward of Roughstock gave the song a 4/5, saying that, although the song "get[s] a bit too repetitious," said the song's "acoustic arrangements d[id] a great job to highlight [Zac] Brown's voice on the verses."
Mark Deming of Allmusic, in his review of the album, stated that the song, as well as "Highway 20 Ride," "show the influence of the more sentimental branches of the Texas singer-songwriter tradition."

Use in media
The song was used in a 2010 Busch commercial featuring the band.

Chart performance
"Free" is the fourth single from the band's debut album to reach Number One on the Hot Country Songs charts, having peaked on the chart dated for the week ending August 21, 2010. Its peak makes Zac Brown Band the first country music act to have four Number One singles from a debut album since Brooks & Dunn's Brand New Man produced four Number Ones between 1991 and 1992.

Year-end charts

Certifications

References

2010 singles
2008 songs
Zac Brown Band songs
Atlantic Records singles
Song recordings produced by Keith Stegall
Bigger Picture Music Group singles
Country ballads
Songs written by Zac Brown